Gretchen Marie Gumabao Fullido (born June 4, 1984) is a Filipina anchor and model. She rose to prominence after hosting and having guest appearances on several talk shows, televised competitions and sports events. Fullido is the current anchor for the segment, "Star Patrol" on TV Patrol and under contract with ABS-CBN and TFC.

Career

2004–2009
In 2004, Fullido started her career as a courtside reporter for the UAAP until 2007. She was also a host for Sports Talk and Chismax on DZMM and became a reporter for TV Patrol in 2008.

2010–present: TV Patrol
In 2010, Fullido became the replacement anchor to Phoemela Barranda for Star Patrol.

In 2013, Fullido later appeared reporting the scores and the stars that have attended the game at the UAAP Season '76. She appeared again in the Celebrity Basketball Match, where she again hosted the game. She again appeared in It's Showtime's 4th-anniversary special, where she gained a guest appearance in the final two episodes of the week-long celebration.

On October 5, 2018, Fullido filed sexual harassment, libel complaints against ABS-CBN executive Cheryl Favila and ABS-CBN News segment producer Maricar Asprec, along with news reporter Marie Lozano, who allegedly “besmirched her reputation” by saying that she filed sexual harassment complaints to leverage her employment status at the network. The entertainment reporter accuses two executives of sending her text messages with sexual innuendos and requesting sexual favors. She also accused them of making it difficult for her to work as an anchor and reporter for TV Patrol when she rejected their advances.

Controversy

She also accused Ces Drilon of victim-shaming after Drilon allegedly said Fullido deserved to be harassed for being willing to wear a bikini to boost TV Patrol ratings. However, in March 2019, the Quezon City Prosecutor junked the libel raps.

Personal life
Fullido is the cousin of the Gumabao siblings (Paolo, Marco, Kat and Michele) and also her cousin of actress host & Former PBB Housemate Barbie Imperial. She is a niece of former actor Dennis Roldan.

Filmography

Television

Radio shows

References

1984 births
Living people
Filipino television presenters
Filipino television journalists
Filipino YouTubers
Filipino women journalists
Filipino women television presenters
ABS-CBN personalities
ABS-CBN News and Current Affairs people
Star Magic